Vidice may refer to:

 Vidice (Domažlice District), a village in the Czech Republic
 Vidice (Kutná Hora District), a village in the Czech Republic